Colin Frederick Hill (born 12 November 1963) is a Northern Irish former professional footballer who played as a centre-back and right-back.

He notably played top flight football for Arsenal, Sheffield United and Leicester City, where he saw time in the Premier League with the latter. He also played in the top divisions of Portugal and Sweden for both Marítimo and Trelleborgs as well as in the Football League for Brighton & Hove Albion, Colchester United and Northampton Town. He was capped 27 times by Northern Ireland, scoring one goal.

He is now a commercial director for the Professional Footballers' Association.

Career
Hill played as a youth for Hillingdon Borough before joining Arsenal on schoolboy forms in 1977, becoming an apprentice in 1980 and turning professional in 1981. Initially a striker, he was converted into a defender and made his debut against Norwich City on 20 April 1983. He made 7 appearances in total that season, and went on to play 37 league games in 1983–84, mostly at right-back, but the signing of Viv Anderson forced him out of the first team and he spent most of the next two seasons in the reserves.

Hill left Arsenal for Portuguese side Marítimo in July 1986 on a free transfer, having played 51 games and scoring one goal for Arsenal. He later had spells with Colchester United, Sheffield United (winning them promotion to the First Division in 1989–90), Leicester City (winning promotion to the Premier League in 1995–96, although he missed out on the 1997 League Cup Final), Trelleborgs and Northampton Town. He also won 27 caps for Northern Ireland.

Personal life
After retiring Colin spent ten years working in the Commercial and Hospitality sector for Leicester City FC, The Q Group and the THA Group.

Colin is now a Commercial Executive for The PFA..

Honours

Club
Sheffield United
 Football League Second Division Runner-up (1): 1989–90

Leicester City
 Football League Division One Playoff Winner (1): 1995–96
 Football League Division One Playoff Runner-up (1): 1992–93

Northampton Town
 Football League Division Two Playoff Runner-up (1): 1997–98

References

External links
Arquivas de Bola 1986-1987 season stats (Portuguese)
Football Plus profile
Northern Ireland's Footballing Greats profile
Sporting Heroes profile

Profile and stats at FoxesTalk
PFA Website

1963 births
Living people
Association football defenders
Association footballers from Northern Ireland
Expatriate association footballers from Northern Ireland
Northern Ireland international footballers
Premier League players
Arsenal F.C. players
C.S. Marítimo players
Colchester United F.C. players
Sheffield United F.C. players
Leicester City F.C. players
Trelleborgs FF players
Northampton Town F.C. players
Hillingdon Borough F.C. players
Primeira Liga players
Allsvenskan players
Expatriate footballers in Portugal
British expatriates in Portugal
Expatriate footballers in Sweden
Expatriate sportspeople from Northern Ireland in Sweden